Zhang Dejiang (born 4 November 1946) is a Chinese retired politician. He served as the Chairman of the Standing Committee of the 12th National People's Congress, roughly the equivalent of a speaker of parliament in other countries between 2013 and 2018. He was also a member of the Politburo Standing Committee of the Chinese Communist Party (CCP), deputy head of the National Security Commission and the top official responsible for Hong Kong and Macau affairs.

Zhang has extensive regional governance experience unmatched by senior leaders of his generation. He successively served as the Party Secretary of the provinces of Jilin, Zhejiang and Guangdong. The SARS outbreak began in Guangdong and occurred during Zhang's term as the provincial party chief there. He served as Vice-Premier in charge of energy, telecommunications, and transportation under Premier Wen Jiabao, widely known for being Wen's 'troubleshooter' of choice, leading various disaster response task forces, such as during the 2009 Heilongjiang mine explosion and the 2011 Wenzhou train collision. In March 2012, Zhang replaced Bo Xilai as the party secretary of Chongqing.

Zhang held a seat on the 25-member Politburo of the Chinese Communist Party between 2002 and 2017.  After serving two terms on the body, Zhang was promoted to the Politburo Standing Committee at the 18th Party Congress in 2012.

Early life 
Zhang, a native of Tai'an County, Liaoning, attended Yanbian University in Yanji, Jilin, where he studied the Korean language. Zhang enrolled in Kim Il-sung University in North Korea in August 1978 and received a degree in economics in 1980. His connections to North Korea and his handling of illegal immigration from that country as a local official in Jilin are believed to be key factors in his rise to power.

Early career

Jilin 
Zhang rose to prominence during the era of general secretary Jiang Zemin, first in Jilin's Yanbian Prefecture, where he is credited with handling the issue of illegal immigration from North Korea. Zhang accompanied Jiang on a visit to North Korea in March 1990 and was promoted to deputy party secretary for Jilin soon after. Jiang described Yanbian under Zhang as a "model prefecture" later that year. In 1995, he was made party secretary of Jilin, beginning a long road of serving as the first-in-charge of various provincial-level jurisdictions.

Zhejiang 
In 1998, Zhang became party secretary of Zhejiang. Zhang was popular among business leaders in Zhejiang due to his relatively laissez-faire attitude towards private enterprise. Zhang was known for allowing private business to operate freely, within the bounds of the law.

In 2001, Zhang wrote an article attacking the idea of allowing business owners to join the Communist Party, claiming that doing so would ruin the party.

Party chief of Guangdong
In November 2002, Zhang was transferred to Guangdong to become its Party Secretary. He also earned a seat on the Politburo of the Chinese Communist Party. During his tenure in Guangdong Zhang focused on issues such as the privatisation of the economy, education, and the alleviation of poverty.

SARS 
Zhang's appointment came immediately after the beginning of the SARS crisis, which began in Guangdong. Zhang initially responded to the outbreak by restricting the flow of information to the public about SARS. While Zhang and other leaders in Guangdong were accused of mishandling SARS, they were praised by the World Health Organization and the central government for controlling the spread of the virus locally as well as the treatment regime employed to treat SARS patients.

Economy 
Zhang arrived in Guangdong at a time when the province's economic growth seemed to be lagging coastal provinces such as Jiangsu and Shandong, both of which were a mere several hundred billion yuan away from 'catching up' to Guangdong's GDP figures.  Zhang made it a top priority to stimulate the province's economy.  During his five-year tenure, Zhang worked to integrate the economies of the Pearl River Delta. Immediately after arriving in Guangdong, Zhang commissioned studies on increasing economic interdependence among Hong Kong, Macau, Guangdong, Fujian, Jiangxi, Guizhou, Sichuan, Yunnan, Hunan, Hainan, and Guangxi. Critics called Pan-Pearl Delta economic integration an empty concept and alleged that Zhang was pushing the policy as a platform for future promotion. A senior journalist compared Zhang's ambitions to that of Bo Xilai, "Bo Xilai manipulates the media to promote himself, while Zhang Dejiang manipulates the media to promote his grandiose plans."

Freedom of speech 
Critics accuse Zhang of suppressing freedom of the press and the right to protest. In addition to being criticised for poor handling of the SARS outbreak, Zhang was blamed for the police shooting of villagers protesting inadequate compensation for seized land in 2005. The shooting incident is believed to have led to as many as 20 deaths. During Zhang's tenure controls on the press were tightened. During this period, many editors left the Southern Daily, and the 21st Century World Herald was shuttered. These newspapers were seen as the 'bastions of liberal media' in China.

In 2005, Hong Kong activist Leung Kwok-hung created a stir when he carried apples to Guangdong to present to Zhang as a gift. The apples were a reference to the banning of reporters from the anti-Communist Apple Daily newspaper from attending the visit of Hong Kong lawmakers to Guangdong. Leung was further prevented from presenting a letter to Zhang while another legislator expressed support for independent labour unions in mainland China  Zhang responded that China would not allow such a move because it did not want a Polish-style revolution.

Health and education
Zhang also spearheaded initiatives to improve public health. For example, he implemented a plan known as "one medical station per village", granting modern clinical services to underdeveloped villages for the first time.  Zhang's achievements at a time when national health care reform seemed to be failing gained him recognition from officials at the national Ministry of Health.

While planning for Guangzhou's "Education Town" began in 2000, Zhang approved the project immediately after his appointment to Guangdong and construction began in 2003. Before building began thousands of police and relocation officials armed with electric truncheons, dogs, and helicopters cleared the site of 10,000 villagers. Many villagers complained of inadequate compensation. Local media outlets were banned from reporting negative news about the project and law firms refused to handle compensation cases due to their sensitive nature. Construction was completed in a mere nine months. Contractors working on the project complained that the completion deadline was too tight and that they could not guarantee the quality of their work. Numerous artefacts believed to date to the Western Han Dynasty were found during construction, but archaeologists were usually barred from entering the construction site.  Zhang said of the rapid progress, "It's a modern urban construction management miracle." In 2004 a group of villa owners whose homes were confiscated to build the Guangzhou University Town threatened to sue Zhang, along with other officials, for abusing their authority. The property owners claimed that their homes were seized to provide premium land for property development.

Patron ties 
It is widely believed that Zhang owes his appointment as Guangdong party secretary to then-party leader Jiang Zemin. Nonetheless, Zhang was not considered a part of the "Shanghai clique" of Jiang's closest associates. There was speculation that Zhang was allowed to remain in power in Guangdong because he switched allegiances in favour of Hu Jintao during the leadership struggle in 2003. Critics of Zhang say he obtained power through his good relationships with senior leaders instead of real achievements.

Vice-premiership 
Zhang was appointed vice-premier in 2008. As vice-premier Zhang oversaw China's energy, telecommunications, and transportation industries. He also took over as the head of a central task force on Production Safety.

During a trip to Pakistan in 2010, Zhang was awarded the Hilal-i-Pakistan by the Pakistan's president for his role in strengthening ties between the two countries.

As Vice-Premier, Zhang served as a 'troubleshooter-in-chief', often being dispatched to scenes of ongoing disasters to direct relief operations.  He therefore emerged as a visible face of the national leadership during incidents which required on-site presence of political leaders.  Zhang was the highest-ranked official on the site of the 2009 Heilongjiang mine explosion, which killed over one hundred people.  He also led the response team to the crash of Henan Airlines Flight 8387 in Yichun, Heilongjiang.

During the July 2011 Wenzhou train collision, Zhang, in his capacity as Vice-Premier in charge of transportation, was dispatched to Wenzhou to lead the search and rescue efforts on directives from General Secretary Hu Jintao and Premier Wen Jiabao. Independent sources said that he set up his 'headquarters' at the Shangri-La Hotel in downtown Wenzhou, instead of at the crash scene itself. He shouldered some responsibility for the botched handling of the rescue operations, which was widely criticised on Chinese media.

Chongqing
Zhang was appointed to lead Chongqing's party organisation in March 2012 following the removal of Bo Xilai as local party chief due to a political scandal that sent shockwaves through the top echelons of the Communist Party leadership. Zhang retained his position as Vice-Premier during his term in Chongqing. Zhang's appointment at the sensitive time demonstrated the high level of trust placed in him among competing factions of the top leadership.

Immediately after taking office in Chongqing, Zhang made statements to ease the concerns of the business community that Bo's removal would lead to a slowdown to the city's economy. Chongqing's newspapers all featured the details of Zhang's resume immediately after his appointment. During a televised government meeting Chongqing's mayor, Huang Qifan, expressed his support for Zhang. Huang was a close ally of Bo. Civil servants in Chongqing were called to meetings where they were required to pledge allegiance to the municipality's new leadership. During the same meetings, officials were told to make social and political stability their top priorities.

Politburo Standing Committee
Zhang was appointed a member of the decision-making Politburo Standing Committee at the 18th Party National Congress held in November 2012 and also became the top official responsible for Hong Kong and Macau affairs. A few days later, he was replaced by Sun Zhengcai as party secretary of Chongqing. In March 2013, he was elected Chairman of the Standing Committee of the National People's Congress, replacing Wu Bangguo, who retired.  On 24 January 2014, the Politburo of the Chinese Communist Party (CCP) Central Committee announced Zhang's appointment as Vice-Chairman of the National Security Commission under general secretary Xi Jinping.

On the issue of electoral reform in Hong Kong, Zhang stuck close to the party line, reiterating the view that Beijing did not favour public nominations to the position of Chief Executive of the territory, and opposed the Occupy Central campaign.  Zhang also publicly endorsed the "satisfactory" performance of Leung Chun-ying, the Chief Executive of Hong Kong, who came under immense pressure during the Umbrella Movement to step down from office.

Since ascending to the Standing Committee, Zhang also ostensibly continued his role as an 'expert' in Korean affairs, meeting with South Korean President Park Geun-hye on two occasions: during the latter's visit to Beijing in June 2013, and on his own official visit to Seoul in June 2015.

Zhang arrived in Hong Kong on 17 May 2016 for a three-day visit in his capacity as the official responsible for Hong Kong and Macau affairs to unprecedentedly level of security. Parts of the city were in lockdown by the 8,000 police officers who were eventually deployed. Zhang was protected by heavily armed police officers and a 45-car cortège. Despite the high level of alert, pro-democracy activists managed to put up massive banners in prominent locations to welcome Zhang – whilst some banners recalled the Umbrella revolution slogan "I want genuine universal suffrage", another, which read: “End Chinese Communist Party dictatorship”, was hung up and visible to Zhang's motorcade from the airport. Zhang spoke at a policy conference on General Secretary Xi Jinping's One Belt, One Road economic project.

Hong Kong affairs
On 6 February 2017, multiple media reports said Zhang Dejiang and Sun Chunlan, head of the party's United Front Work Department, were in Shenzhen to meet with some Election Committee members from the major business chambers and political groups. It was reported that Zhang told the electors that the Politburo had decided to support Carrie Lam in the election.

Family
Zhang is married to Xin Shusen, who was born in July 1949. Xin was originally from Haiyang, Shandong province. She served in a variety of senior executive roles at the China Construction Bank, and a member of the 11th National Committee of the Chinese People's Political Consultative Conference.

References

External links 
 Zhang's page on Xinhua 
 Austin, Nathaniel (16 November 2012)  "China's New Leadership: Unveiled" pg. 4 Zhang Dejiang. The Diplomat

1946 births
Living people
Alternate members of the 14th Central Committee of the Chinese Communist Party
Chairmen of the Standing Committee of the National People's Congress
Chairperson and vice chairpersons of the Standing Committee of the 12th National People's Congress
Chinese Communist Party politicians from Liaoning
Delegates to the 18th National Congress of the Chinese Communist Party
Delegates to the 19th National Congress of the Chinese Communist Party
Delegates to the 9th National People's Congress
Delegates to the 10th National People's Congress
Delegates to the 11th National People's Congress
Kim Il-sung University alumni
Members of the 15th Central Committee of the Chinese Communist Party
Members of the 16th Politburo of the Chinese Communist Party
Members of the 17th Politburo of the Chinese Communist Party
Members of the 18th Politburo Standing Committee of the Chinese Communist Party
People's Republic of China politicians from Liaoning
Political office-holders in Chongqing
Political office-holders in Guangdong
Political office-holders in Jilin
Political office-holders in Zhejiang
Politicians from Anshan
Regional leaders in the People's Republic of China
Sent-down youths
Yanbian University alumni